Frederick Edward Guest,  (14 June 1875 – 28 April 1937) was a British politician best known for being Chief Whip of Prime Minister David Lloyd George's Coalition Liberal Party, 1917–1921.  He was also Secretary of State for Air between 1921 and 1922. He won the bronze medal with the British polo team at the 1924 Summer Olympics in Paris.

Early life
Frederick Edward Guest was born in London, the third son of Ivor Guest, 1st Baron Wimborne (1835–1914) and Lady Cornelia Spencer-Churchill (1847–1927). The Guest family had made its fortune in the iron and steel industry during the 18th and 19th centuries and had married into the aristocracy. The Wimbornes were Conservatives who had been friends of Benjamin Disraeli. His mother was the eldest daughter of John Spencer-Churchill, 7th Duke of Marlborough.

Guest's four brothers were also politically active, with Ivor Guest serving as 2nd Baron Wimborne, then 1st Viscount Wimborne, a junior minister, and Lord Lieutenant of Ireland. In addition, Henry Guest and Oscar Guest were Members of Parliament (MPs), while Lionel Guest (1880–1935) was a member of the London County Council. His sister Frances Charlotte Guest (1865–1957) was married to Frederic Thesiger, 1st Viscount Chelmsford, who served as Viceroy of India.

Guest was a first cousin of British Prime Minister Winston Churchill, Charles Spencer-Churchill, 9th Duke of Marlborough, and Henry Innes-Ker, 8th Duke of Roxburghe, as well as a nephew of Conservative politician Lord Randolph Churchill, George Spencer-Churchill, 8th Duke of Marlborough, and Lady Anne Emily Spencer Churchill, who was married to the 7th Duke of Roxburghe. His cousin, the 8th Duke of Roxburghe, was married to American heiress Mary Goelet, the only daughter of Ogden Goelet.

Career

Education and military career
Educated at Winchester, Guest chose the military profession. He was commissioned as second-lieutenant in the Infantry militia, East Surrey Regiment, and promoted to lieutenant on 7 April 1894. After apprenticeship in the militia, Guest was on 15 May 1897 appointed an officer in the 1st Life Guards, and promoted to lieutenant in that regiment on 23 November 1898.  He was sent to Egypt in 1899, and in late November that year was part of a Camel Corps during the operations leading to the defeat of the Khalifa (mentioned in despatches 25 November 1899). He served in South Africa during the Second Boer War from 1901, returning home in late June 1902, following the end of hostilities. Back in the United Kingdom, he returned to a regular posting with his regiment in September 1902. He was decorated for bravery, and rose to captain before retiring from active duty in 1906.

Political career
In 1904, during the controversy within the Conservative Party over adopting protectionism, Guest and other members of his family followed his cousin and close friend, Winston Churchill, into the Liberal Party in support of free trade — and perhaps also to accelerate their political careers.  In 1906 Guest became private secretary to Churchill, by then a junior minister in Sir Henry Campbell-Bannerman's Liberal government.  Guest attempted three times to enter the House of Commons before winning the vote in the East Dorset seat in the January 1910 general election. Although he remained unseated because of election irregularities by his constituency agent, he was reelected in December 1910. Known in the political world as "Freddie Guest," he was a popular backbencher, became a Liberal Party whip in 1911, in the same year was elected a charter member of the cross-bench Other Club of political insiders, and was appointed Treasurer of the Household (Deputy Chief Whip) in 1912.

When the First World War began in August 1914, Guest returned to active service as aide-de-camp to Field Marshal Sir John French, commander of the British Expeditionary Force in France. Guest performed confidential missions for French, liaising with the War Office and with political leaders. In 1916 Guest served in the East African theatre of war and was awarded the Distinguished Service Order.  After being invalided out of the army following serious illness, Guest resumed his political career. In May 1917 he joined Lloyd George's Coalition government as joint Patronage Secretary of the Treasury – effectively chief whip for the Coalition Liberals. On 3 December 1917 Guest sent Lloyd George a 14-page memo stating that although only around a third of Liberal MPs were staunch supporters of his predecessor H. H. Asquith, the time was not yet right to oust him from the Liberal leadership.

Guest was appointed to the Privy Council in the 1920 New Year Honours, entitling him to the style "The Right Honourable", and in 1921 was promoted to Secretary of State for Air, a post he held until the Coalition fell from power in October 1922. In the general election of November 1922 Guest lost his seat but in 1923 was returned for Stroud, then in 1924 for Bristol North. After losing as a Liberal in the 1929 election, he rejoined the Conservative Party, winning as a Conservative for Plymouth Drake in 1931 and remaining in this position until his death.

Polo

Guest competed for Great Britain in polo at the 1924 Summer Olympics. The British Polo team received the bronze medal. He played alongside Frederick W. Barrett, Dennis Bingham and Kinnear Wise.

Guest can be found among the winners of the Roehampton Trophy. He would also lend horses to the English polo team for the International Polo Cup matches.

Family and private life
On 28 June 1905, Guest married Amy Phipps (1873–1959), daughter of American industrialist Henry Phipps (1839–1930), at St George's, Hanover Square in London. Amy was prominent as a women's suffragist, philanthropist and aviation enthusiast and owned valuable property in Long Island. The couple were frequent visitors to the United States in the 1920s and 1930s. They had a daughter and two sons who became American citizens:
Winston Frederick Churchill Guest (1906–1982), a polo player who married Helena Woolworth McCann and later Lucy Douglas Cochrane (1920–2003)
Raymond R. Guest (1907–1991), the United States Ambassador to Ireland from 1965 to 1968, who married three times to Elizabeth Polk, Ellen Tuck French Astor, and Princess Caroline Murat (1923–2012).
Diana Guest Manning (1909–1994)

Apart from his political career he was an amateur motor racing driver and aeroplane pilot. In 1928 he was instrumental in founding the British airfield operator National Flying Services. In 1930, he became deputy master of the Guild of Air Pilots and Air Navigators, and master in 1932. He also played polo, was a big-game hunter in East Africa, and was a celebrated man-about-town in London and New York City society. Among his homes was Villa Artemis in Palm Beach, Florida and the former du Pont estate in Roslyn, New York. He was a member of the River and Links Clubs of New York and the Piping Rock Club in Long Island. He was also a friend of the Duke of Windsor, formerly King Edward VIII.

Guest died from cancer in 1937, at the age of 61.

Footnotes

References
Biography, Oxford Dictionary of National Biography

External links 
 

1875 births
1937 deaths
Younger sons of barons
Sportspeople from London
People educated at Winchester College
British Life Guards officers
British Army personnel of World War I
Liberal Party (UK) MPs for English constituencies
British Secretaries of State
Secretaries of State for Air (UK)
Commanders of the Order of the British Empire
Companions of the Distinguished Service Order
Members of the Privy Council of the United Kingdom
Conservative Party (UK) MPs for English constituencies
UK MPs 1910
UK MPs 1910–1918
UK MPs 1918–1922
UK MPs 1923–1924
UK MPs 1924–1929
UK MPs 1931–1935
UK MPs 1935–1945
Deaths from cancer in England
Treasurers of the Household
English polo players
Olympic polo players of Great Britain
Olympic bronze medallists for Great Britain
Polo players at the 1924 Summer Olympics
Freddie
Roehampton Trophy
British sportsperson-politicians
Medalists at the 1924 Summer Olympics
National Liberal Party (UK, 1922) politicians
Members of the Parliament of the United Kingdom for constituencies in Dorset
Members of the Parliament of the United Kingdom for constituencies in Devon
Olympic medalists in polo
Politicians from Plymouth, Devon